Duboisia myoporoides, or corkwood, is a shrub or tree native to high-rainfall areas on the margins of rainforest in eastern Australia. It has a thick and corky bark.
The leaves are obovate to elliptic in shape, 4–15 cm long and 1–4 cm wide. The small white flowers are produced in clusters. This is followed by globose purple-black berries (not edible).

Uses
The leaves are a commercial source of pharmaceutically useful alkaloids. The same alkaloids render all plant parts poisonous. The leaves contain a number of alkaloids, including hyoscine (scopolamine), used for treating motion sickness, stomach disorders, and the side effects of cancer therapy.

A bush medicine developed by Aboriginal peoples of the eastern states of Australia from the tree was used by the Allies in World War II to stop soldiers getting seasick when they sailed across the English Channel during the Invasion of Normandy. Later, it was found that the same substance could be used in the production of scopolamine and hyoscyamine, which are used in eye surgery, and a multi-million dollar industry was built in Queensland based on this substance.

Chemical composition 
It mostly contains tropane alkaloids. Scopolamine and atropine are major alkaloids of this tree. Other alkaloids include hyoscyamine, norhyoscyamine, tigloidine, valtropine, tiglyoxytropine.

References

Further literature
 

Nicotianoideae
Solanales of Australia
Trees of Australia
Medicinal plants of Oceania
Flora of New South Wales
Flora of Queensland
Plants described in 1810
Crops originating from Australia
Taxa named by Robert Brown (botanist, born 1773)